

The Best Off Skyranger is a French-designed two-seat ultralight utility aircraft, produced by Best Off, of Toulouse. It is a high-wing conventional monoplane with tricycle undercarriage, and of fabric-covered tubular construction.

The Skyranger is also manufactured under licence by Aero Bravo in Brazil, SkyRanger Aircraft in the United States (as a kit), Aeros in Ukraine and at least 150 were built by Synairgie in France, too.

Some 900 are flying throughout the world.

Variants
Skyranger
Original model, introduced 1990.
Skyranger Vfun
Renamed original model for the Fédération Aéronautique Internationale microlight class. Standard engines available are the  Rotax 582 two-stroke, the  Rotax 912UL, the  Rotax 912ULS,  Jabiru 2200, the  VW and the  HKS 700E four-stroke powerplants. The aircraft has also been equipped with the JLT Motors Ecoyota engine.
Skyranger Vmax
Improved model for United Kingdom BCAR Section "S" certification, with ventral fin. Standard engines available are the  Rotax 582 two-stroke, the  Rotax 912UL, the  Rotax 912ULS,  Jabiru 2200, the  VW and the  HKS 700E four-stroke powerplants.
Skyranger Swift
Improved model based on the Vmax for the US light-sport aircraft market, with reduced wingspan.

Specifications (Skyranger)

See also

Comparable aircraft 
 Ikarus C42
 Raj Hamsa X-Air "H" Hanuman

Notes

References
 Jackson, Paul. Jane's All The World's Aircraft 2003–2004. Coulsdon, UK: Jane's Information Group, 2003. .

External links

 Official website

1990s French civil utility aircraft
1990s French ultralight aircraft
Skyranger
Single-engined tractor aircraft
High-wing aircraft
Aero Bravo aircraft
Aeros aircraft
Aero Synergie aircraft
Sky Ranger
Aircraft first flown in 1990